Teller Ammons (December 3, 1895 – January 16, 1972) was an American attorney and politician who served as the 28th Governor of Colorado from 1937 to 1939. He was the first Colorado governor to be born in the state.

Early life 
On December 3, 1895, Ammons was born in Colorado. Ammons' father was Elias M. Ammons, a former Governor of Colorado. Ammons' mother was Elizabeth (nee Fleming) Ammons. Ammons was named for his father's friend, U.S. Senator Henry Moore Teller.

Career 
He served with the 154th Infantry Regiment in the United States Army in France during World War I.

After the war, he returned to Colorado to work on a ranch and in a newspaper office.  He earned a law degree from the University of Denver's Westminster Law School in 1929.

Ammons was elected to the Colorado Senate in 1930 and served until 1935, when Denver Mayor Benjamin F. Stapleton appointed him as Denver city attorney.

In 1936, Ammons was elected Governor of Colorado. On January 12, 1937, Ammons began his term as the Governor of Colorado, until January 10, 1939. As Governor, he was responsible for the execution of Joe Arridy, who was innocent of the crime he was accused of; he had refused to pardon Arridy or commute his sentence. After one two-year term, he was defeated for reelection in 1938 by Ralph L. Carr.

During World War II, he served as a lieutenant colonel on the selection and assignment board for military officers until 1944.  In 1944, he was part of the military government of Guam.  He separated from the service in 1945.

Afterward, he practiced law in Denver until his retirement.

Personal life 
Ammons' wife was Esther Daves Ammons. They had one child, whose name is Davis Ammons.

Ammons died on January 16, 1972, and was buried in Fairmount Cemetery in Denver, Colorado.

References

External links
State of Colorado biography
National Governors Association biography

1895 births
1972 deaths
Democratic Party Colorado state senators
Democratic Party governors of Colorado
United States Army personnel of World War I
Politicians from Denver
20th-century American politicians
United States Army officers
Military personnel from Colorado
Burials at Fairmount Cemetery (Denver, Colorado)